The 1931 Copa del Rey Final was the 31st final of the Copa del Rey, the Spanish football cup competition. Athletic Bilbao beat Betis 3–1 and won their eleventh title, the second in a row.

Match details

References

External links
RSSSF.com

1931
Copa
Real Betis matches
Athletic Bilbao matches